Marc Marut (born April 11, 1979) is a Canadian actor best known for playing the mentally deranged Johnny McFarley in the 1994 horror film The Paperboy when he was 14 years old. He has acted and appeared in various television series and films including the TV adaptation of Welcome to Dead House, Road to Avonlea, Kung Fu: The Legend Continues, Tekwar, Harrison Bergeron, and Street Legal.

Personal life 

Marut was born in Winnipeg, Manitoba and started his acting career in 1985 as Gavroche in the first Canadian production of Les Misérables in Toronto, Ontario. As a child actor, Marut gained mainstream attention outside of Canada for his lead role in The Paperboy, a film which was critically panned but has also since received a cult following. He is also known for playing Ray, a boy killed by mutated workers at a chemical factory in a small town, in Welcome to Dead House. He has appeared in a number of films, television series, theatrical productions and television commercials, mostly Canadian-based.

Filmography

References

External links
 
 https://coolass.tv

Canadian male television actors
Canadian male film actors
1979 births
Living people